Oumar Toure (born 18 September 1998) is a Guinean professional footballer who plays as a midfielder.

References

External links

1998 births
Living people
Guinean footballers
Association football midfielders
Juventus F.C. players
WSG Tirol players
FK Kukësi players
A.E. Sparta P.A.E. players
2. Liga (Austria) players
Football League (Greece) players
Guinean expatriate footballers
Expatriate footballers in Italy
Expatriate footballers in Austria
Expatriate footballers in Albania
Expatriate footballers in Greece
Guinea under-20 international footballers